The 2011 CSIO Schweiz (English: CSIO Switzerland) was the 2011 edition of the CSIO Schweiz, the Swiss official show jumping horse show, at Gründenmoos in St. Gallen. It was held as CSIO 5*.

The first horse show were held 1884 at St. Gallen. Up to the 1970s the CSIO Schweiz was held on year in Geneva and the next year in Lucerne. In the next years, up to 2006, the CSIO Schweiz was held one year in St. Gallen and in the outer year in Lucerne. Since 2007 each year the CSIO Schweiz are held in St. Gallen.

The 2011 edition of the CSIO Schweiz was held between June 2, 2011 and June 5, 2011.

FEI Nations Cup of Switzerland 
The 2011 FEI Nations Cup of Switzerland was part of the 2011 CSIO Schweiz. It was the third competition of the 2011 FEI Nations Cup and was held at Friday, June 3, 2011 at 1:30 pm. The competing teams were: the United States of America, Denmark, Germany, the Netherlands, Ireland, Belgium, France and Great Britain. Also a Swiss team as host nation had the chance to start in the competition.

The competition was a show jumping competition with two rounds and optionally one jump-off. The height of the fences were up to 1.60 meters. All teams were allowed to start in the second round. The competition is endowed with 200,000 €.

(grey penalties points do not count for the team result)

Grosses Jagdspringen 
The “Grosses Wegelin Jagdspringen” was the biggest competition on Saturday at the 2011 CSIO Schweiz. The sponsor of this competition is the Swiss bank company Wegelin & Co. It was held at Saturday, June 4, 2011 at 1:00 pm.

The competition was a speed and handiness show jumping competition (faults at fences will be converted into seconds; this seconds will be added to the time of the competitor). The height of the fences was up to 1.45 meters. It is endowed with 80,000 CHF.

Longines Grand Prix 
The Longines Grand Prix was the mayor competition of the 2011 CSIO Schweiz. The sponsor of this competition is Longines. It was held at Sunday, June 5, 2011 at 1:40 pm.

The competition was a show jumping competition with two rounds, the height of the fences was up to 1.60 meters. It is endowed with 300,000 CHF. Because of a hailstorm the competition had to be interrupted for 45 minutes, much riders did not start. Ten riders had no faults in the first round, winner of the Grand Prix is a second time after 2006 Nick Skelton.

External links 
 
 2011 results

References 

CSIO Schweiz
CSIO Schweiz
CSIO Schweiz